Chase the Case is a British television game show created by Lynsey Wylie and produced by Bandicoot Productions for BBC One, that premiered on 17 September 2018. Hosted by Dan Walker, the show features five contestants who compete to win money hidden in briefcases by answering questions and eliminating one another from the game.  The show also features Deborah Anderson as a security guard who handles the cases.

Format
Cash amounts of £0, £100, £500, £1,000 and £5,000 are hidden in five briefcases, each of which is given to a different contestant at the start of the game.

Rounds 1–4: Reconnaissance Rounds
The host states a category at the start of each round, then asks a series of questions on the buzzer. The first two contestants to give three correct answers are allowed to make separate visits to a soundproof vault, in which the host reveals information about one opponent's case of the contestant's choosing. The first contestant can either see the amount in the chosen opponent's case or learn whether it is higher or lower than their own amount; the second contestant receives the option not taken by the first. At no time will a contestant be told the amount in their own case.

Final
The contestants stand at the beginning of a four-step path, and the host asks general-knowledge questions on the buzzer. A correct answer allows a contestant to move one step ahead, while a miss freezes them out of the next question. Every step after the first is marked red to indicate it as a "steal zone." When a contestant moves onto a steal zone, they may challenge one opponent if they wish, or keep their own case and continue the game normally.

A challenge consists of four questions, alternating between the two contestants and starting with the challenged opponent. Either contestant can win by answering more of their own questions correctly than the other. If the opponent wins, all cases stay with their holders. If the challenger wins, they take control of the opponent's case and the opponent is eliminated from the game with no winnings. The case originally held by the challenger is removed from play and opened to reveal its value. If the score is tied after all four questions have been asked, a tiebreaker is played on the buzzer. Once a challenge is resolved, the buzzer questions resume.

The first contestant to answer a total of five buzzer questions correctly, or the last one remaining in the event of four challenge eliminations, wins the game and receives whatever money is in their case.

Transmissions

Regular series

References

External links

2018 British television series debuts
2018 British television series endings
2010s British game shows
BBC high definition shows
BBC television game shows
English-language television shows